Alexander Honnold (born August 17, 1985) is an American rock climber best known for his free solo ascents of big walls. Honnold rose to prominence in June 2017 when he became the first person to free solo El Capitan in Yosemite National Park, a feat that sports writer Daniel Duane described as "one of the great athletic feats of any kind, ever." Honnold also holds the record for the fastest ascent of the Yosemite triple crown, an 18-hour, 50-minute link-up of Mount Watkins, The Nose, and the Regular Northwest Face of Half Dome. In 2015, he won a Piolet d'Or for the Fitz Traverse in Patagonia with Tommy Caldwell.

Honnold is the author (with David Roberts) of the memoir Alone on the Wall (2015) and the subject of the 2018 biographical documentary Free Solo, which won a BAFTA and an Academy Award.

Life and work 
Honnold was born in Sacramento, California, the son of community college professors Dierdre Wolownick (b. 1953) and Charles Honnold (1949–2004). His paternal roots are German and his maternal roots are Polish. He started climbing in a climbing gym at the age of 5 and was climbing "many times a week" by age 10.  He participated in many national and international youth climbing championships as a teenager.

"I was never, like, a bad climber [as a kid], but I had never been a great climber, either," he says. "There were a lot of other climbers who were much, much stronger than me, who started as kids and were, like, instantly freakishly strong like they just have a natural gift. And that was never me. I just loved climbing, and I've been climbing all the time ever since, so I've naturally gotten better at it, but I've never been gifted."

After graduating from Mira Loma High School as part of the International Baccalaureate Programme in 2003, he enrolled at the University of California, Berkeley, to study civil engineering. His maternal grandfather died and his parents got divorced during his first year of college, and Honnold skipped many of his classes to boulder by himself at Indian Rock.

He dropped out of Berkeley and spent time living at home and driving around California to go climbing. "I'd wound up with my mom's old minivan, and that was my base," he said. "I'd use it to drive to Joshua Tree to climb or I'd drive to LA to see my girlfriend. I destroyed that van fairly quickly; it died on me one day, and for the next year I lived just on my bicycle and in a tent."

In 2007, he bought a 2002 Ford Econoline E150 van, which allowed him to focus on climbing and follow the weather.

According to a 2011 Alpinist profile:

He gained mainstream recognition after his 2008 solo of the Regular Northwest Face of Half Dome was featured in the film Alone on the Wall and a subsequent 60 Minutes interview.

In November 2011, Honnold and Hans Florine missed setting the record time on the Nose route on Yosemite's El Capitan by 45 seconds.  At the time the record stood at 2:36:45, as set by Dean Potter & Sean Leary in November 2010.  On June 17, 2012, Honnold and Florine set a new record of 2:23:46 (or 2:23:51) on that same route.

In November 2014, Clif Bar announced that they would no longer sponsor Honnold, along with Dean Potter, Steph Davis, Timmy O'Neill and Cedar Wright. "We concluded that these forms of the sport are pushing boundaries and taking the element of risk to a place where we as a company are no longer willing to go," the company wrote in an open letter.

In 2016, he was subjected to functional magnetic resonance imaging scans that revealed that, unlike other high sensation seekers, his amygdala barely activates when watching disturbing images.
He however confesses feeling fear occasionally.
Through imagination and practice, he has desensitized himself to most fearful situations.

On June 3, 2017, he made the first free solo ascent of El Capitan, completing the 2,900-foot (884m) Freerider route (5.12d VI) in 3 hours and 56 minutes. The feat, described as "one of the great athletic feats of any kind, ever", was documented by climber and photographer Jimmy Chin and documentary filmmaker E. Chai Vasarhelyi, as the subject of the documentary Free Solo. Among other awards, the film won the Academy Award for Best Documentary Feature (2018).

On June 6, 2018, Honnold teamed up with Tommy Caldwell to break the speed record for the Nose on El Capitan in Yosemite. They completed the approximately 3,000-foot (914m) route in 1:58:07, becoming the first climbers to complete the route in under two hours.

In 2021, National Geographic signed Honnold for an original docuseries about his quest to climb across the peaks of Greenland. Also in 2021, Honnold started a podcast about climbing.

Personal life
Honnold lived in a van for over a decade. "I don't think 'van life' is particularly appealing," he says. "It's not like I love living in a car, but I love living in all these places. I love being in Yosemite; I love being basically wherever the weather is good; I love being able to follow good conditions all over. And be relatively comfortable as I do it. And so that pretty much necessitates living in a car ... If I could, like, miraculously teleport a house from place to place, I'd prefer to live in a nice comfortable house. Though, honestly, the van is kind of nice. I like having everything within arm's reach. When I stay in a hotel room – like, sometimes you get put up in a really classy hotel room, and it's really big, and you have to walk quite a ways to the bathroom, and you're like, 'Man, I wish I had my [pee] bottle.' Who wants to walk all the ways to the bathroom in the middle of the night when you could just lean over and grab your bottle and go?" The van he lived in was custom-outfitted with a kitchenette and cabinets.

In 2017, Honnold bought a home in the Las Vegas area. "I didn't have any furniture at first, so I lived in the van in the driveway for the first couple weeks. It felt more like home than an empty house did." Around the same time, he replaced the Ford Econoline van he had lived in since 2007 and put 200,000 miles on with a new 2016 Ram ProMaster, which he still lives and travels in for most of the year.

Honnold is a vegetarian, and he does not drink alcohol or use drugs. Between climbs, he runs or hikes to maintain fitness. He is an avid reader with interests in classic literature, environmentalism, and economics, and he describes himself as an anti-religion atheist and a feminist.

Honnold met Sanni McCandless at a book signing in 2015; they became a couple soon after. Sanni and her relationship with Honnold feature prominently in Free Solo.  On December 25, 2019, Honnold announced, via social media, that he and McCandless were engaged. On September 13, 2020, Honnold announced via Instagram that he and McCandless had married. Honnold's and McCandless daughter was born on February 17, 2022.

Dierdre Wolownick, Alex Honnold's mother, started climbing at age 60 and is the oldest woman to climb El Capitan (first at the age of 66 and then, breaking her own record, again at age 70).

Philanthropy

In 2012, Honnold began giving away one-third of his income to solar projects that increased energy access world-wide. Soon, this idea expanded to form the Honnold Foundation. The Honnold Foundation's mission is "promoting solar energy for a more equitable world".

Books
 Alone on the Wall: Alex Honnold and the Ultimate Limits of Adventure. London: Pan, 2015. Co-authored with David Roberts. .

Filmography 
While Honnold is best known for his starring role in the Oscar-winning documentary Free Solo, he has also appeared in a number of other films.

The Sharp End (2007)
Alone on the Wall (2008) 
Progression (2009) 
Honnold 3.0 (2012)
Valley Uprising (2014) 
A Line Across the Sky (2015) 
Showdown at Horseshoe Hell (2015)
Africa Fusion (2016) 
Queen Maud Land (2018) 
Free Solo (2018)
The Nose Speed Record (reel rock 14) (2019)
Fine Lines (2019) 
Duncanville (2020) (TV)
 The Alpinist (2021)
 Explorer: The Last Tepui (2022)
 Edge of the Unknown with Jimmy Chin (2022)

Awards 
 2010: Golden Piton award from Climbing magazine, for endurance climbing
 2015: Honnold together with Tommy Caldwell was awarded the Piolets d'Or, for the first full traverse of the Fitz Roy Range in Patagonia, Argentina.
 2018: Robert and Miriam Underhill Award from American Alpine Club, for excellence in various fields of climbing
 2018: Special mention of Piolets d'Or for his outstanding contribution to climbing during 2017

Selected climbs

Big walls 

2007, Freerider (VI 5.13a, 37 pitches), Yosemite, California – One day free ascent with Brian Kimball
2007, Astroman (5.11c, 10 pitches) and The Rostrum (5.11c, 8 pitches), Yosemite, California – Second person after Peter Croft (1987) to free solo both in a day
2007, Salathe Wall (VI 5.13b/c), Yosemite, California – Eleventh free ascent
2008, Bushido (5.13+) and Hong Kong Phooey (5.13b–5.14), Utah
2008, Moonlight Buttress (V 5.12d, 1200 ft), Zion, Utah – First Free solo
2008, The Regular Northwest Face of Half Dome, Yosemite, California – First free solo
2012, The Nose (VI 5.8 A2), Yosemite, California,  El Capitan, – Former speed record of 2:23:46 with Hans Florine
2012, The Regular Northwest Face of Half Dome, Yosemite, California – Speed solo in 1:22
2012, Yosemite Triple Crown – Mt. Watkins, El Capitan, and Half Dome, Yosemite, California – Solo in 18:50
2014, Muir Wall – Shaft Variation (V 5.13b/c) – Speed record of 12 hours
2014, El Corazon (V 5.13b) – Speed record of 15:30
2014, El Sendero Luminoso (V 5.12d, 1,750 ft, 15 pitch), El Potrero Chico, Mexico – First free solo ascent, ~ 3 hours
2014, University Wall (5.12a C2, 8 pitch), Squamish, British Columbia, Canada – First free solo
2016, Complete Scream (E8 6b), Northern Ireland, United Kingdom – Free solo 
2017, Freerider (5.13a VI), Yosemite, California,  El Capitan,  – First Free solo
2018, The Nose (VI 5.8 A2), Yosemite, California,  El Capitan,  – Speed record of 1:58:07 with Tommy Caldwell
2019, El Niño  (VI 5.13c), Yosemite, California,  El Capitan,  – Second entirely free ascent via Pineapple Express variation with Brad Gobright
2019, Passage to Freedom (VI 5.13d), Yosemite, California,  El Capitan,  – First free ascent with Tommy Caldwell

Bouldering 
2011, The Mandala , Bishop, California
2010, Ambrosia , Bishop, California – second ascent
2012, Too Big to Flail  or 8b (5.13d), Bishop, California – first ascent

Single pitch 
2008, Parthian Shot, New Statesman, Meshuga (solo), flash of Gaia (subsequently repeated it solo), London Wall, on-sight solo
2010, The Green Mile 8c+(5.14c), Jailhouse crag, San Francisco
2010, Rainbow Arch (5.12+, top-roped), Ennedi Desert, Chad – First ascent
2011, Heaven (5.12d) and Cosmic Debris (5.13b), Yosemite National Park – Free solo 
2011, The Phoenix (5.13a), Yosemite National Park – Free solo. The Phoenix was the first 5.13a of the United States.
2011, Cobra Crack (5.14b), Squamish, British Columbia ascent is etched in a board between that of Will Stanhope and Pete Whittaker
2019, Arrested Development 9a (5.14d) Mount Charleston, Nevada, second ascent after Jonathan Siegrist.

Mountain 
2009, Unnamed (VI 5.12 A2) Low's Gully, Borneo – Attempted first free ascent
2014, The Fitz Roy Traverse (5.11d C1 65 degrees, 5000m), Fitz Roy massif, Patagonia – Completed over five days with Tommy Caldwell
2016, Torre Traverse, Patagonia – Second ascent. A north-to-south traverse of Cerro Standhardt, Punta Herron, Torre Egger, and Cerro Torre. Completed in under 21 hours with Colin Haley.

See also 
History of rock climbing
List of first ascents (sport climbing)

References

Further reading

External links 
 
 
  (video)

1985 births
American atheists
American feminists
American people of Polish descent
American rock climbers
Atheist feminists
Free soloists
Living people
Male feminists
Sportspeople from Sacramento, California
University of California, Berkeley alumni
Piolet d'Or winners